The G class, or "G-boat" also known as the Marine Alutech Watercat M8 landing craft is a type of vessel in use by the Finnish Navy and the Swedish Navy. The G-boat was originally designed for the Swedish Navy which ordered about 100 of them. It is primarily used for amphibious landings by, and transportation of, marines. It has a very low draught (approximately 20 cm) at high speeds which makes it ideal for amphibious assault even in shallow waters. It has a cargo capacity of 8 men or one metric ton.

Operators
 Finnish Navy: G 98–99, G 101-G 135
 Swedish Navy 1-100

See also
Uisko class landing craft
Jurmo class landing craft
Jehu-class landing craft

External links 

 Finnish Defence Forces Website of The Finnish Defence Forces
 Marine Alutech Website of Marine Alutech
  Video in Youtube

Ships of the Finnish Navy
Ships of the Swedish Navy
Landing craft
Military boats